James Austen was an English clergyman, best known for being the eldest brother of celebrated novelist Jane Austen.  His father George Austen's living had been in Steventon, Hampshire, and James succeeded him in this position, in 1801.

Austen's mother, formerly Cassandra Leigh, was a member of a prominent Oxford family, and was a descendant of one of the founders of St. John's College.  Cassandra's family connection entitled her sons to be legacy students, who did not have to compete for admission, and who were entitled to attend tuition free.
Austen attended Oxford University and his younger brother Henry both attended, and shared accommodation.

Like his more famous sister, Austen was a writer.  According to Felicity Day, writing in The Telegraph, for a year in the 1790s, he published a weekly periodical called The Loiterer, and wrote much of its content.  He published several pieces by his brother Henry, and Day speculated that he may have published one piece by his teenage sister Jane.  Day says the satirical pieces in The Loiterer resembled the unpublished juvenilia the teenage Jane wrote for her family.

James and his brother Henry were both romantically interested in their cousin, Eliza de Feuillide, the daughter of their aunt Philadelphia Austen Hancock.  Eliza married Henry.

Austen married at 27, and was widowed when he was 30.  His first wife bore him a daughter, Anna.  His second wife, bore him at least two more children, James Edward and Caroline.

References 

English Protestant ministers and clergy
1765 births
1819 deaths
People from Steventon, Hampshire
Austen family
Jane Austen
19th-century English Anglican priests
Alumni of St John's College, Oxford